"I Believe" is an inspirational R&B ballad by American singer R. Kelly. The song initially appeared on the Osmosis Jones soundtrack in 2001 but was later re-written and re-arranged in order to become an anthem for U.S. President Barack Obama's inauguration. The non-album song was released via Amazon.com on December 16, 2008 and appeared later on the compilations Playlist: The Very Best of R. Kelly and Epic. The song has received positive reviews from fans and critics alike.

Charts

References

Pop ballads
Contemporary R&B ballads
R. Kelly songs
Songs written by R. Kelly
Song recordings produced by R. Kelly
2008 singles
2001 songs
Jive Records singles
Osmosis Jones